The Bighorn River is a short river originating in the Alberta foothills, and is a tributary of the North Saskatchewan River. The river, as well as the nearby Bighorn Range and Bighorn Dam are named for the Bighorn sheep which dominate the area. The name first appeared in 1865.

Flowing under Mount McGuire, Bighorn River soon takes on Littlehorn and Sunkay Creeks, before plummeting over the impressive Crescent Falls. After the falls, the Bighorn travels through a significant canyon, before passing through the Bighorn Indian Reserve.  The river then empties into the North Saskatchewan River after Lake Abraham.

See also 
List of Alberta rivers

References 

Rivers of Alberta
North Saskatchewan River